The 1999 Hamilton Tiger-Cats season was the 42nd season for the team in the Canadian Football League and their 50th overall. The Tiger-Cats finished in 2nd place in the East Division with an 11–7 record and won the Grey Cup in a rematch of the previous year's championship game against the Calgary Stampeders.

Offseason

CFL draft

Preseason

Roster

Regular season

Season standings

Schedule

Postseason

Grey Cup

Awards and honours

1999 CFL All-Stars
 Darren Flutie - Slotback
 Rob Hitchcock - Safety
 Danny McManus - Quarterback
 Joe Montford - Defensive End
 Calvin Tiggle - Linebacker
 Gerald Vaughn - Halfback

References

Hamilton Tiger-Cats seasons
James S. Dixon Trophy championship seasons
Grey Cup championship seasons
Hamilton
Hamilton Tiger-Cats